The following is a list of Major League Baseball players, retired or active. As of the end of the 2011 season, there have been 629 players with a last name that begins with F who have been on a major league roster at some point.

F

Jay Faatz
Red Faber β
Jorge Fábregas
Bunny Fabrique
Roy Face
Lenny Faedo
Bill Fahey
Brandon Fahey
Ferris Fain
George Fair
Rags Faircloth
Jim Fairey
Ron Fairly
Anton Falch
Pete Falcone
Bibb Falk
Cy Falkenberg
Brian Falkenborg
Bob Fallon
Charlie Fallon
George Fallon
Pete Falsey
Rikkert Faneyte
Cliff Fannin
Jim Fanning
Stan Fansler
Carmen Fanzone
Monty Fariss
Alex Farmer
Ed Farmer
Mike Farmer
Kyle Farnsworth
Jim Farr
Steve Farr
Sid Farrar
Doc Farrell
Duke Farrell
Jack Farrell (1879–1889 2B)
Jack Farrell (OF)
Jack Farrell (1874 2B)
John Farrell (2B)
John Farrell (P)
Kerby Farrell
Turk Farrell
John Farrow
Sal Fasano
Frederick Fass
Jeff Fassero
Jim Faulkner
Charles Victory Faust
Ernie Fazio
Carlos Febles
Dutch Fehring
Ryan Feierabend
Mike Felder
Marv Felderman
Harry Feldman
Scott Feldman
Pedro Feliciano
Gus Felix
Junior Félix
Pedro Feliz
Bob Feller β
Happy Felsch
John Felske
Terry Felton
Frank Fennelly
Bobby Fenwick
Alex Ferguson
Bob Ferguson (IF)
Bob Ferguson (P)
Charlie Ferguson
George Ferguson
Joe Ferguson
Félix Fermín
Ramón Fermín
Alex Fernandez
Chico Fernández
Frank Fernandez
Jared Fernández
Jose Fernandez
Nanny Fernandez
Osvaldo Fernández
Sid Fernandez
Tony Fernández
Al Ferrara
Don Ferrarese
Anthony Ferrari
Mike Ferraro
Rick Ferrell β
Wes Ferrell
Sergio Ferrer
Tom Ferrick
Bob Ferris
Hobe Ferris
Dave Ferriss
Alex Ferson
Lou Fette
Mike Fetters
Willy Fetzer
Chick Fewster
Neil Fiala
John Fick
Robert Fick
Mark Fidrych
Jim Field
Nate Field
Cecil Fielder
Prince Fielder
Bruce Fields
Jocko Fields
Josh Fields
Alfredo Fígaro
Mike Figga
Chone Figgins
Ed Figueroa
Jesús Figueroa
Luis Figueroa
Nelson Figueroa
Jeremy Fikac
Bob File
Tom Filer
Steve Filipowicz
Mark Filley
Dana Fillingim
Pete Filson
Jack Fimple
Joel Finch
Tommy Fine
Rollie Fingers β
Jim Finigan
Herman Fink
Pembroke Finlayson
Bob Finley
Chuck Finley
Steve Finley
Neal Finn
Happy Finneran
Hal Finney
Lou Finney
Gar Finnvold
Mike Fiore
Tony Fiore
Jeff Fiorentino
Steve Fireovid
Dan Firova
Bill Fischer
Carl Fischer
Hank Fischer
Jeff Fischer
Todd Fischer
William Fischer
Mike Fischlin
John Fishel
Leo Fishel
Bob Fisher
Brian Fisher
Chauncey Fisher
Cherokee Fisher
Don Fisher
Ed Fisher
Eddie Fisher
George Fisher
Gus Fisher
Jack Fisher
Maurice Fisher
Ray Fisher
Showboat Fisher
Tom Fisher (1904)
Tom Fisher (1967)
Carlton Fisk β
Max Fiske
Wes Fisler
Ed Fitz Gerald
Charlie Fitzberger
Brian Fitzgerald
Howie Fitzgerald
John Fitzgerald (Rochester Broncos pitcher)
John Fitzgerald (Boston Reds pitcher)
John Fitzgerald (1950s pitcher)
Matty Fitzgerald
Mike Fitzgerald (C)
Mike Fitzgerald (OF)
Ray Fitzgerald
Shaun Fitzmaurice
Al Fitzmorris
Ed Fitzpatrick
Freddie Fitzsimmons
Tom Fitzsimmons
Max Flack
Ira Flagstead
John Flaherty
Martin Flaherty
Patsy Flaherty
Al Flair
Mike Flanagan
Steamer Flanagan
Tim Flannery
Roy Flaskamper
Jack Flater
Frank Fleet
Ángel Fleitas
Bill Fleming
Dave Fleming
Huck Flener
Art Fletcher
Darrin Fletcher
Elbie Fletcher
Frank Fletcher
Sam Fletcher
Scott Fletcher
Tom Fletcher
Van Fletcher
Elmer Flick β
Lew Flick
Don Flinn
John Flinn
Silver Flint
Hilly Flitcraft
Curt Flood
Tim Flood
Kevin Flora
Don Florence
Bernardo Flores
Gil Flores
Jesse Flores
Jesús Flores
Jose Flores
Randy Flores
Ron Flores
Bryce Florie
Ben Flowers
Dickie Flowers
Jake Flowers
Wes Flowers
Bobby Floyd
Bubba Floyd
Cliff Floyd
Gavin Floyd
Doug Flynn
Jocko Flynn
Mike Flynn
Gene Fodge
Jim Fogarty
Josh Fogg
Lee Fohl
Hank Foiles
Curry Foley
John Foley
Marv Foley
Tom Foley (IF)
Tom Foley (OF)
Will Foley
Tim Foli
Rich Folkers
Dee Fondy
Lew Fonseca
Joe Fontenot
Mike Fontenot
Ray Fontenot
Chad Fonville
Barry Foote
Jesse Foppert
Jim Foran
P. J. Forbes
Davy Force
Ben Ford
Bill Ford
Curt Ford
Dan Ford
Dave Ford
Hod Ford
Lew Ford
Matt Ford
Russ Ford
Ted Ford
Wenty Ford
Whitey Ford β
Tom Fordham
Brook Fordyce
Brownie Foreman
Frank Foreman
Happy Foreman
Mike Fornieles
Bob Forsch
Ken Forsch
Terry Forster
Ed Forsyth
Tim Fortugno
Bartolomé Fortunato
Gary Fortune
Tony Fossas
Ray Fosse
Casey Fossum
Alan Foster
Eddie Foster
Elmer Foster
George Foster
John Foster
Kevin Foster
Leo Foster
Roy Foster
Rube Foster
Steve Foster
Bob Fothergill
Steve Foucault
Keith Foulke
Jack Fournier
Bill Fouser
Dave Foutz
Frank Foutz
Art Fowler
Boob Fowler
Dexter Fowler
Dick Fowler
Jesse Fowler
Alan Fowlkes
Andy Fox
Chad Fox
Charlie Fox
Eric Fox
Henry Fox
Howie Fox
Jake Fox
Nellie Fox β
Pete Fox
Terry Fox
Jimmie Foxx β
Joe Foy
Paul Foytack
Jeff Francis
Ray Francis
Ben Francisco
Frank Francisco
John Franco
Julio Franco
Matt Franco
Jeff Francoeur
Terry Francona
Tito Francona
Kevin Frandsen
Fred Frankhouse
Franklin
Jack Franklin
Ryan Franklin
Wayne Franklin
Herman Franks
John Frascatore
Chick Fraser
Willie Fraser
Jason Frasor
George Frazier
Joe Frazier
Lou Frazier
Vic Frazier
Johnny Frederick
Kevin Frederick
Scott Fredrickson
Roger Freed
Bill Freehan
Ryan Freel
Buck Freeman
Choo Freeman
Hersh Freeman
John Freeman
Mark Freeman
Marvin Freeman
Gene Freese
George Freese
Jake Freeze
Jim Fregosi
Vern Freiburger
Howard Freigau
Alejandro Freire
Dave Freisleben
Tony Freitas
Charlie French
Jim French
Larry French
Ray French
Walter French
Benny Frey
Lonny Frey
Steve Frey
Hanley Frias
Pepe Frias
Bernie Friberg
Marion Fricano
Jim Fridley
Pat Friel
Bob Friend
Owen Friend
John Frill
Frankie Frisch β
Danny Frisella
Harry Fritz
Larry Fritz
Bill Froats
Doug Frobel
Todd Frohwirth
Art Fromme
Dave Frost
Emiliano Fruto
Jerry Fry
Jeff Frye
Travis Fryman
Woodie Fryman
Charlie Fuchs
Brian Fuentes
Mike Fuentes
Tito Fuentes
Oscar Fuhr
Kosuke Fukudome
Kazuo Fukumori
Jeff Fulchino
Sam Fuld
Ed Fuller
Frank Fuller
John Fulgham
Nig Fuller
Shorty Fuller
Curt Fullerton
Chick Fullis
Brad Fullmer
Chick Fulmer
Washington Fulmer
Bill Fulton
Aaron Fultz
Dave Fultz
Frank Funk
Liz Funk
Tom Funk
Rafael Furcal
Carl Furillo
J. J. Furmaniak
Eddie Fusselback
Chris Fussell
Mike Fyhrie

References
Last Names starting with F - Baseball-Reference.com

 F